Jack Henry (born 29 August 1998) is a professional Australian rules footballer playing for the Geelong Football Club in the Australian Football League (AFL). He was drafted by Geelong with their first selection and sixteenth overall in the 2016 rookie draft. In his sixth match, he recorded eighteen disposals, eleven marks (including five intercept marks), and three tackles in the sixty-one point win against  in round seven to earn the round nomination for the 2018 AFL Rising Star. Henry moved forward in the second half of the 2018 AFL season and kicked 8 goals in a handful of games in the forward line, including a three-goal haul against Brisbane at GMHBA Stadium. Henry is of Lebanese and Kiwi descent.

Statistics
Updated to the end of the 2022 season.

|-
| 2018 ||  || 38
| 22 || 8 || 4 || 160 || 73 || 233 || 84 || 66 || 0.4 || 0.2 || 7.3 || 3.3 || 10.6 || 3.8 || 3.0 || 0
|-
| 2019 ||  || 38
| 23 || 0 || 4 || 175 || 66 || 241 || 97 || 34 || 0.0 || 0.2 || 7.6 || 2.9 || 10.5 || 4.2 || 1.5 || 0
|-
| 2020 ||  || 18
| 21 || 1 || 0 || 157 || 48 || 205 || 82 || 35 || 0.0 || 0.0 || 7.5 || 2.3 || 9.8 || 3.9 || 1.7 || 0
|-
| 2021 ||  || 38
| 24 || 7 || 2 || 217 || 119 || 336 || 150 || 43 || 0.3 || 0.2 || 9.0 || 5.0 || 14.0 || 6.3 || 1.8 || 3
|-
| scope=row bgcolor=F0E68C | 2022# ||  || 38
| 17 || 4 || 1 || 119 || 65 || 184 || 82 || 24 || 0.2 || 0.1 || 7.0 || 3.8 || 10.8 || 4.8 || 1.4 || 0
|- class=sortbottom
! colspan=3 | Career
! 107 !! 20 !! 11 !! 828 !! 371 !! 1199 !! 495 !! 202 !! 0.2 !! 0.1 !! 7.7 !! 3.5 !! 11.2 !! 4.6 !! 1.9 !! 3
|}

Notes

Honours and achievements
Team
 AFL premiership player: 2022
 2× McClelland Trophy: 2019, 2022

Individual
 Geelong F.C. Best Young Player Award: 2018
 AFL Rising Star nominee: 2018 (round 7)

References

External links

1998 births
Living people
Geelong Football Club players
Geelong Football Club Premiership players
Geelong Falcons players
Australian rules footballers from Victoria (Australia)
One-time VFL/AFL Premiership players